KFT may refer to:

Kanjari language, ISO 639-3 code
Korlátolt felelősségű társaság, Hungarian for limited liability company
KFT, a Hungarian rock band